The 2017 Music City Bowl was a college football bowl game played on December 29, 2017, at Nissan Stadium in Nashville, Tennessee. It was one of the 2017–18 bowl games concluding the 2017 NCAA Division I FBS football season. The 20th annual Music City Bowl, the game was sponsored by the Franklin American Mortgage Company and was officially known as the Franklin American Mortgage Music City Bowl.

The 2017 Music City Bowl featured the Kentucky Wildcats (7–5) from the Southeastern Conference (SEC) and the Northwestern Wildcats (9–3) from the Big Ten Conference.  Northwestern beat Kentucky by a score of 24–23.

Teams
This was only the second time that Kentucky and Northwestern had played against each other.  Their previous match-up was on October 20, 1928, and was won by Northwestern, 7–0.

Game summary

Scoring summary

Statistics

Controversy
Kentucky running back Benny Snell was ejected in the 1st half for shoving a referee attempting to help him up. However, the video of the incident shows that Snell was simply attempting to remove the referee's hands from his wrists.

References

2017–18 NCAA football bowl games
2017
2017 Music City Bowl
2017 Music City Bowl
2017 in sports in Tennessee
December 2017 sports events in the United States